The Water Framework Directive 2000/60/EC is an EU directive which commits European Union member states to achieve good qualitative and quantitative status of all water bodies (including marine waters up to one nautical mile from shore) by 2015. It is a framework in the sense that it prescribes steps to reach the common goal rather than adopting the more traditional limit value approach. The Directive's aim for 'good status' for all water bodies will not be achieved, with 47% of EU water bodies covered by the Directive failing to achieve the aim.

Objectives of the Directive
The Directive aims for 'good status' for all ground and surface waters (rivers, lakes, transitional waters, and coastal waters) in the EU.

The ecological and chemical status of surface waters are assessed according to the following criteria (see also: freshwater environmental quality parameters):
 Biological quality (fish, benthic invertebrates, aquatic flora)
 Hydromorphological quality such as river bank structure, river continuity or substrate of the river bed
 Physical-chemical quality such as temperature, oxygenation and nutrient conditions
 Chemical quality that refers to environmental quality standards for river basin specific pollutants. These standards specify maximum concentrations for specific water pollutants. If even one such concentration is exceeded, the water body will not be classed as having a “good ecological status”.

The Water Framework Directive stipulates that groundwater must achieve "good quantitative status" and "good chemical status" (i.e. not polluted) by 2015. Groundwater bodies are classified as either "good" or "poor". Ecological Quality Ratio (EQR) is used to determine the ecological water quality status.

Article 14 of the directive requires member states "to encourage the active involvement of interested parties" in the implementation of the directive. This is generally acknowledged to be an assimilation of the Aarhus Convention.

Spatial management of river basins
One important aspect of the Water Framework Directive is the introduction of River Basin Districts. These areas have been designated, not according to administrative or political boundaries, but rather according to the river basin (the spatial catchment area of the river) as a natural geographical and hydrological unit. As rivers often cross national borders, representatives from several Member States have to co-operate and work together for the management of the basin (so-called transboundary basins). They are managed according to River Basin Management Plans, which should provide a clear indication of the way the objectives set for the river basin are to be reached within the required timescale. They should be updated every six years.

To facilitate data recoding, each stretch of water is given a "Water Framework Directive ID" ("WFDID" or "Waterbody ID"). For example, the stretch of the River Tame, in the West Midlands of England, from the River Blythe to River Anker is referred to as GB104028046440.

Transgressions
The Ebro River Transfer, a project from the Spanish National Hydrological Plan of 2001 was highly criticised as being contrary to the principles of the EU Water Framework Directive, and later put on hold. The project planned to transfer huge amounts of water from the Ebro River to the south-east of Spain with the construction of 120 dams.

See also
EU law
Ecological assessment
Marine debris
Water pollution

References

External links
EU legislation summary
Text of the directive, without tables and graphics, HTML format
Text of the directive, with tables and graphics, PDF format
EU Commission site with general and background information
EU Twinning Project Implementing the Water Framework Directive in Croatia

European Union directives
Health and the European Union
Water and politics
2000 in law
2000 in the European Union
Environmental law in the European Union